The End Is My Beginning is a 2010 German-Italian biographical drama film directed by Jo Baier. It is based on the posthumous autobiographical best-seller with the same name written by Tiziano Terzani.

Plot

Cast 

Bruno Ganz as Tiziano Terzani
Elio Germano as  Folco Terzani
Erika Pluhar as  Angela Terzani
Andrea Osvárt as  Saskia Terzani
Nicolò Fitz-William Lay as  Novi

See also    
 List of German films of the 2010s
 List of Italian films of 2010

References

External links

2010 films
Italian biographical drama films
German biographical drama films
2010 biographical drama films
Biographical films about writers
Films based on Italian novels
Films scored by Ludovico Einaudi
2010 drama films
Films directed by Jo Baier
2010s German films